Dance Dreams: Hot Chocolate Nutcracker is an American documentary film directed by Oliver Bokelberg. The film follows Debbie Allen and her students at the Debbie Allen Dance Academy and offers a behind-the-scenes look as they prepare for their annual award-winning holiday version of The Nutcracker, called Hot Chocolate Nutcracker.

It was produced by Shondaland and was released on Netflix on November 27, 2020.

References

External links 
 

2020 documentary films
2020 films
American documentary films
English-language Netflix original films
Netflix original documentary films
Boardwalk Pictures films
2020s English-language films
2020s American films